= Ford Insomnia Response to Stress Test =

The Ford Insomnia Response to Stress Test is a diagnostic tool used to identify individuals predisposed to insomnia.

It is a nine-item self-report instrument that tests the likelihood that an individual will get sleep disturbances following various stressful events.
